Michael L. Fitzgerald (born November 29, 1951) is an American businessman and politician who served as the 25th Treasurer of Iowa from 1983 to 2023. A member of the Democratic Party, he was the longest-serving state treasurer in the United States.

Early life and early career
Fitzgerald was born in Marshalltown, Iowa, in 1951. His parents, James and Clara, were farmers, first near State Center and later Colo. He graduated from Colo Community High School in 1970 and received his bachelor's degree in business administration from the University of Iowa in 1974. Fitzgerald worked as a marketing analyst for Massey Ferguson in Des Moines for eight years before being elected State Treasurer of Iowa in 1982.

State Treasurer (1983-2023)
As State Treasurer, Michael Fitzgerald acts as Iowa's trustee and custodian of the three state pension funds, and invests billions of dollars of state operating funds.

He serves as administrator of Iowa's 529 plans, College Savings Iowa and the Iowa Advisor 529 plan, which offer families an easy, tax-advantaged way to prepare for future college tuition and expenses. These programs currently have more than five billion dollars in combined assets.

When Treasurer Fitzgerald took office in 1983, unclaimed property was a little known program. In his first year as treasurer, he prioritized returning this money and began the Great Iowa Treasure Hunt, which has returned hundreds of millions of dollars since its founding.

As the state's banker, Fitzgerald oversees and administers the Invest in Iowa program, a series of auctions he created in 1983 as a way to invest state funds in Iowa financial institutions at competitive rates. The Linked Investments for Tomorrow (LIFT) program, introduced in 1986, also provides capital to Iowa's small business owners who wish to create or expand their business. Treasurer Fitzgerald is committed to providing Iowans with unbiased financial information and education programs, and is an advocate of financial literacy at all ages. He has worked with Visa, the Iowa Student Aid Commission, the Iowa Student Loan Liquidity Corporation, Money Smart Week and many more to provide financial literacy opportunities to Iowans.

Michael Fitzgerald lost reelection in 2022 to Republican candidate Roby Smith. Fitzgerald served for 40 years from 1983-2023, making him the longest serving State Treasurer in United States history.

Appointments and awards
As state treasurer, Fitzgerald is active in national organizations that affect issues in Iowa:

 College Savings Plans Network (past chair)
 National Association of State Treasurers (past president)
 National Association of State Auditors, Comptrollers and Treasurers (past president)
 National Association of Unclaimed Property Administrators (past president)
 State Debt Management Network

In addition, Treasurer Fitzgerald serves on the following boards and committees in Iowa (* indicates voting member):
 Executive Council*
 Honey Creek Premier Destination Park Authority*
 Iowa Centennial Memorial Foundation*
 Iowa Comprehensive Petroleum Underground Storage Tank Board*
 Iowa Cultural Trust
 Iowa Grain Indemnity Board*
 Iowa Higher Education Loan Authority*
 Iowa Finance Authority
 Iowa Lottery Authority
 Iowa Public Employees Retirement System (IPERS)*
 Peace Officers' Retirement, Accident and Disability System*
 Rate Setting Committee*
 State Appeals Board*
 State Records Commission*
 Southeast Iowa Regional Port Authority
 Tobacco Settlement Authority*

In 1989, City & State magazine named him one of the "most valuable public officials working in state government."

Electoral history

|+ State Treasurer of Iowa, 2022
! Party !! Candidate !! Vote percentage
|-
| Republican || Roby Smith || 51%
|-
| Democratic || Michael L. Fitzgerald || 49%
|-
|}

|+ State Treasurer of Iowa, 2018
! Party !! Candidate !! Vote percentage
|-
| Democratic || Michael L. Fitzgerald || 54%
|-
| Republican || Jeremy Davis || 42%
|-
| Libertarian || Tim Hird || 2%
|-
|}

|+ State Treasurer of Iowa, 2014
! Party !! Candidate !! Vote percentage
|-
| Democratic || Michael L. Fitzgerald || 53%
|-
| Republican || Sam Clovis || 44%
|-
| Libertarian || Keith A. Laube || 3%
|-
|}

|+ State Treasurer of Iowa, 2010
! Party !! Candidate !! Vote percentage
|-
| Democratic || Michael L. Fitzgerald || 53%
|-
| Republican || David D. Jamison || 47%
|-
|}

|+ State Treasurer of Iowa, 2006
! Party !! Candidate !! Vote percentage
|-
| Democratic || Michael L. Fitzgerald || 99%
|-
|  || Write-in || 1%
|-
|}

|+ State Treasurer of Iowa, 2002
! Party !! Candidate !! Vote percentage
|-
| Democratic || Michael L. Fitzgerald || 55%
|-
| Republican || Matthew Whitaker || 43%
|-
| Libertarian || Tim Hird || 2%
|-
|}

|+ State Treasurer of Iowa, 1998
! Party !! Candidate !! Vote percentage
|-
| Democratic || Michael L. Fitzgerald || 55%
|-
| Republican || Joan Fitzpatrick Bolin || 43%
|-
|}

|+ State Treasurer of Iowa, 1994
! Party !! Candidate !! Vote percentage
|-
| Democratic || Michael L. Fitzgerald || 54%
|-
| Republican || Jay Irwin || 44%
|-
| Natural Law Party || Elizabeth Koehler || 2%
|-
|}

|+ State Treasurer of Iowa, 1990
! Party !! Candidate !! Vote percentage
|-
| Democratic || Michael L. Fitzgerald || 59%
|-
| Republican || Burtwin L. Day || 39%
|-
| Grassroots Party || Derrick P. Grimmer || 2%
|-
|}

|+ State Treasurer of Iowa, 1986
! Party !! Candidate !! Vote percentage
|-
| Democratic || Michael L. Fitzgerald || 58%
|-
| Republican || John Nystrom || 42%
|-
|}

|+ State Treasurer of Iowa, 1982
! Party !! Candidate !! Vote percentage
|-
| Democratic || Michael L. Fitzgerald || 51%
|-
| Republican || Maurice E. Baringer  || 48%
|-
|}

Treasurer Fitzgerald considered running for Governor of Iowa against Republican incumbent Terry Branstad in 2014 but decided against it.

References

External links

Iowa State Treasurer

|-

1951 births
21st-century American politicians
Iowa Democrats
Living people
Politicians from Marshalltown, Iowa
State treasurers of Iowa
University of Iowa alumni